Two-time defending champion Diede de Groot defeated Yui Kamiji in the final, 6–3, 6–3 to win the women's singles wheelchair tennis title at the 2020 US Open.

Seeds

Draw

Finals

References

External links 
 Draw

Wheelchair Women's Singles
U.S. Open, 2020 Women's Singles